Sophia Wadia, née Sophia Camacho, was a Colombian-born naturalized Indian theosophist, littérateur, the founder of PEN All India Centre and the founder editor of its journal, The Indian PEN. She also cofounded The Indian Institute of World Culture, Bengaluru and the Asian Book Trust, Mumbai. The Government of India honoured Wadia in 1960, with the award of Padma Shri, the fourth highest Indian civilian award for her services to the nation.

Biography
Sophia Camacho was born in 1901 in Colombia and did her education in her motherland, Paris, London and New York. In 1927, she met B. P. Wadia, an Indian theosophist on tour to European countries, was influenced by his philosophy and married him in 1928. The next year, she went to India with her spouse and got involved in his activities. The Wadias founded several branches of the United Lodge of Theosophists in various places in Europe and founded the first Indian branch in Mumbai in 1929.

The couple founded the All India Centre of the International P.E.N. in Mumbai in 1930 and launched two journals, The India PEN and The Aryan Path. Sophia was the editor of The India Pen and remained in that position till her death. In 1945, she established The Indian Institute of World Culture in 1945 at Basavanagudi, near Bengaluru in the South Indian state of Karnataka. During this period, she published two books, The Brotherhood of Religions in 1936 and Preparation for Citizenship in 1941, the latter with foreword by Nobel Laureate, Rabindranath Tagore. The second edition of The Brotherhood of Religions came out in 1944 with foreword written by Mahatma Gandhi. She was also instrumental in the establishment of Asian Book Trust in Mumbai which later published her husband's renowned work, The Gandhian Way.

Sophia Wadia continued her social life after her husband's death in 1958 and organized eleven All India Writers' Conferences. The Government of India awarded her the civilian honour of Padma Shri in 1960. She died on 27 April 1986, at the age of 85.

See also

 United Lodge of Theosophists
 The Indian Institute of World Culture
 PEN International
 Theosophism

References

Further reading
 
 

Recipients of the Padma Shri in social work
1901 births
1986 deaths
Indian Theosophists
Philosophy writers
Social workers
Colombian emigrants to India
Indian women philosophers
20th-century Indian women writers
20th-century Indian essayists
20th-century Indian women scientists
Indian women educational theorists
20th-century Indian educational theorists
Educators from Karnataka
Women educators from Karnataka
Scholars from Bangalore
20th-century women educators